Sunil Kumar known by his screen name Suni, is an Indian film director, producer, screenwriter and lyricist who works in Kannada cinema. He made his debut with the 2013 critically and commercially successful film Simple Agi Ondh Love Story.

Early life 

Sunil was born on 14 October, 1986 to Vijayalakshmi and Narsimhaiah at K. C. General Hospital in the Malleswaram locality of Bangalore, Karnataka. He has a sister named Harshashree. He completed his pre-university education from Peenya Government College having opted for Science. Pursuing an undergraduate course, he received Bachelor of Science degree in Biotechnology from KLE College in Bangalore. From his younger days, he has spent his time and energy on filling the pages of his notebooks with poems and that is as early as his passion for writing and cinema.

Career

As director 
Suni kick started his career with Janumada Gelathi, where he worked as an assistant director under Dinesh Baboo. Simultaneously working for Januma Janumadallu, under Prema, he later went on to become an associate director for Dinesh Baboo in School Master and other films. Subsequently, focus shifted to a few short films, but when he decided to go independent, what came his way was Simple Agi Ondh Love Story. When producers expected him to cut down budgets with each script, a few friends Pawan Sagar and Suni decided to go independent and invested their own money and made Simple Agi Ondh Love Story on a budget of approximately 30 to 40 lakhs. Bahuparak  and Manamohaka are the two movies which are under production by Suni.

As producer 
Suni began his production house named Suvin Cinemaas.

Filmography

References

External links 

Kannada film directors
Living people
Kannada-language lyricists
Indian male songwriters
Musicians from Bangalore
1986 births
Film directors from Bangalore
21st-century Indian composers
Film producers from Bangalore
Screenwriters from Bangalore
Kannada screenwriters
21st-century male musicians

|}